William Charles Townsend (1803–1850) was an English barrister, known as a historical and legal writer.

Life
He was the second son of William Townsend of Walton, Lancashire, and matriculated at The Queen's College, Oxford, on 4 July 1820, graduating B.A. in 1824 and M.A. in 1827. On 25 November 1828 he was called to the bar at Lincoln's Inn.

Townsend first attached himself to the northern circuit, and then practised at the Cheshire and Manchester assizes. Later he obtained a practice on the North Wales circuit. In 1833 he was elected recorder of Macclesfield. In March 1850 he was appointed a queen's counsel, and in the same year became a bencher of Lincoln's Inn. He died shortly, on 8 May at Burntwood Lodge, Wandsworth Common, the house of his elder brother Richard Lateward Townsend, vicar of All Saints', Wandsworth, Surrey. He was buried in the vaults of Lincoln's Inn.

Works
Townsend wrote:

 The Pæan of Orford, a poem, London, 1826.
 The History and Memoirs of the House of Commons, London, 1843–4. 
 The Lives of Twelve Eminent Judges of the Last and of the Present Century, London, 1846.
 Modern State Trials revised and illustrated, London, 1850.

He also contributed poems to Henry Fisher's Imperial Magazine, around 1820.

Family
In 1834 Townsend married Frances, second daughter of Richard Wood of Macclesfield, who survived him; he died without issue.

Notes

 
Attribution
 

 

1803 births
1850 deaths
English barristers
English writers
Writers from Liverpool
19th-century English lawyers
People from Walton, Liverpool